Tube or tubes may refer to:

 Tube (2003 film), a 2003 Korean film
 The Tube (TV series), a music related TV series by Channel 4 in the United Kingdom
 "Tubes" (Peter Dale), performer on the Soccer AM television show
 Tube (band), a Japanese rock band
 Tube & Berger, the alias of dance/electronica producers Arndt Rörig and Marco Vidovic from Germany
 The Tube Music Network, a music video network that operated between 2006 and 2007
 The Tubes, a San Francisco-based band, popular in the 1970s and 1980s

Other media
 Tube, a freeware game for MS-DOS computers from Bullfrog Productions
 TUBE., an online magazine about visual and performing arts, founded in 2012 in Sacramento, California
 Series of tubes, an analogy for the Internet used by United States Senator Ted Stevens
 Picture tube, term in Paint Shop Pro software for a small digital image with no background
 YouTube, a video sharing website
 Viih Tube (born 2000), Brazilian youtuber and writer

Science, technology, and mathematics

Construction and mechanics
 Tube (fluid conveyance), a long hollow cylinder used for moving fluids
 Tube (structure), building designed to act like a hollow cylinder, cantilevered perpendicular to the ground
 Inner tube, a component of vehicular tires
 Pneumatic tube, a method of transportation using compressed air
 Structural tubing, a type of metal profile used in structural applications
 An underground railway constructed in a circular tunnel by the use of a tunnelling shield

Electronics
 Tube (BBC Micro), an expansion bus on the BBC Micro computer
 Cathode-ray tube, a component used in display devices such as televisions
 Vacuum tube, an electronic component

Mathematics
 Tube domain, in several complex variables
 Tubular neighborhood, in differential geometry
 Cylinder (geometry), from elementary geometry

Other technologies
 Tube (container), a type of packaging for pasty and viscous goods such as toothpaste
 Extension tube, a tool for macro photography
 Test tube, a piece of laboratory equipment

Other uses in science
 Eustachian tube, part of the structure of the ear
 Lava tube, found in volcanic regions

Transportation
 Hudson Tubes, a colloquial historical name for the PATH (rail system)
 The Tube, a widely used name for the London Underground, a rapid transit train system
 Transbay Tube, an underwater rail tube across San Francisco Bay

Other uses
 Tube (toy), a toy that assists play on water
 Tubes (peak), the second highest peak of the Mecsek mountain range in Hungary
 Tubing (recreation), riding on an inner tube as a recreational activity
 Yoplait Tubes or Go-Gurt, a brand of sweetened yogurt
 A type of surf wave

See also
 Pipe (fluid conveyance), a tubular section or hollow cylinder used to convey substances which can flow
 The Tube (disambiguation)
 Microtube (disambiguation)
 Tub (disambiguation)
 Tubing (disambiguation)